Herbert Mendo Ssegujja (born 27 September 1983), is a Ugandan comedian and actor, who performs under the name Teacher Mpamire. He is most famous for mimicking the Ugandan president,  Yoweri Kaguta Museveni. He assumes the stage name Teacher Mpamire.

Background and education
Ssegujja was born in Mukono Town, on 27 September 1983. After attending Bbowa Primary School, he was admitted to Greenlight High School, in Zana, along Kampala–Entebbe Road. He obtained his High School Diploma from Greenlight High School. 

He holds a Bachelor of Education degree from Makerere University, Uganda's oldest and largest public university. He was sponsored by President Yoweri Museveni to study in the Program in Comedy Performing and Writing at the American Comedy Institute, in New York City.

Career

As a teacher
While there, he had the opportunity to teach alongside Arthur Mpamire, his former European History teacher at Greenlight High, on whom he based his stage name and character.

As a comedian
His performances have seen him stage shows in Uganda, Zambia, Malawi, Kenya, Tanzania and other African countries. In 2016, Teacher Mpamire was named "discovery of year" at the Africa Youth Awards held in Accra, Ghana. He is also part of the Fun Factory cast in their weekly comedy shows at the National Theatre, in Kampala.

Awards and nominations

Wardrobe
Ssegujja has a special designer in the Democratic Republic of the Congo who measures and tailors his comedic attire.

Family
Herbert Ssegujja is engaged to his long-time girlfriend, Carol Barekye. The customary introduction ceremony to her parents was held in December 2016.

See also 
 Yoweri Museveni
 Fun Factory Uganda

References

External links
 I was dumped a week after our first kiss - Ssegujja As of 15 December 2019.

Ugandan comedians
1983 births
Living people
Ugandan actors
Ugandan educators
People from Mukono District
People from Central Region, Uganda
Makerere University alumni
American Comedy Institute alumni